Sam Jeffries (born 1 April 1993) is an English rugby union player who plays in the back row for Bristol Bears in Premiership Rugby. He was called up to the England squad on 30 June 2022 as injury cover for Charlie Ewels on the Australia tour.

References 

1993 births
Living people
English rugby union players
Bristol Bears players
Hartpury University R.F.C. players
Rugby union flankers
Rugby union locks